Microcrambus subretusellus is a moth in the family Crambidae. It was described by Stanisław Błeszyński in 1967. It is found in Cuba.

References

Crambini
Moths described in 1967
Moths of the Caribbean
Endemic fauna of Cuba